The South American Marathon Championships (Spanish: Campeonatos Sudamericanos de Maratón) is an annual road running competition organized by CONSUDATLE for athletes representing the countries of its member associations. 

The event was established in 1994 as South American Marathon Cup (Copa Sudamericana de Maratón) following its removal from the main South American Championship programme after 1991.  Discontinued after 2002, the event was reestablished under the current name in 2009.

Editions

Results

Men 

Women 

References

.
Marathon Championships
Recurring sporting events established in 1994
Continental athletics championships